The Family of Christian IX of Denmark is a monumental oil on canvas group portrait painting by Laurits Tuxen of Christian IX of Denmark and his family of European royalty, gathered in the Garden Hall at Fredensborg Palace. The painting is on display in one of the Queen's Reception Rooms at Christiansborg Palace. A reduced copy of the painting hangs in Amalienborg Palace.

Background
Christian IX's six children with Queen Louise married into other European royal families, earning him the sobriquet "the father-in-law of Europe". It was for a while a tradition for them to gather at Fredensborg Palace some time during the summer, bringing their spouses and numerous offspring. These summer days spent together were known as the "Fredensborg days".

Production
The painting was Tuxen's first royal commission. Tuxen stayed at Fredensborg Palace during the Fredensborg Days of188386 to familiarize himself with the appearances of the royal models, but they did not pose together for the painting. The painting was instead based on photographs and portrait studies of the models arranged in smaller groups, which were subsequently composed into the final painting. Christian IX and Queen Louise were photographed at Amalienborg Palace, while most of the other royalty were photographed in the garden hall at Fredensborg Palace. He also visited the foreign models at their residences in England, Greece and Russia. It took him three years to complete the painting.

Description
Christian IX and Queen Louise are seen seated on a sofa in the centre of the picture. The subjects are placed according to rank, the foremost in the front and in the middle of the picture.

People seen in the picture
The 32 people seen the painting are (moving from left to right):
 Prince Albert Victor, Duke of Clarence and Avondale
 The Prince of Wales (later Edward VII of Great Britain)
 The Princess of Wales (later Queen Alexandra of Great Britain)
 Princess Ingeborg of Denmark
 Prince Harald of Denmark
 Prince Georg of Cumberland
 Princess Marie of Cumberland
 Princess Thyra, Duchess of Cumberland
 Princess Alexandra of Cumberland
 Queen Louise of Denmark
 Christian IX of Denmark
 Prince Valdemar of Denmark
 Prince Christian (later Christian X)
 Nicholas Alexandrovich, Tsarevich of Russia (later Tsar Nicholas II)
 Grand Duke Michael Alexandrovich of Russia
 Tsarina Maria Feodorovna of Russia
 Tsar Alexander III of Russia
 Grand Duchess Olga Alexandrovna of Russia
  Frederik, Crown Prince of Denmark (later Frederick VIII)
 Louise, Crown Princess of Denmark (later Queen Louise)
 Princess Thyra of Denmark
 King George I of Greece (born Prince Wilhelm of Denmark)
 Queen Olga of Greece
 Princess Alexandra of Greece
 Princess Marie of Greece
 Princess Louise of Wales (later Princess Royal)
 Prince Carl of Denmark (later Haakon VII of Norway)
 Grand Duke George Alexandrovich of Russia
 Princess Victoria of Wales
 Princess Maud of Wales (later Queen Maud of Norway)
 Grand Duchess Xenia Alexandrovna of Russia
 Princess Louise of Denmark

Exhibition and preliminary works
The painting is on display in one of the Queen's Reception Rooms at Christiansborg Palace.

Tuxen painted several reduced versions of the painting with some variations. He also painted some portrait studies and other preliminary sketches, some of which were afterwards worked up as proper works in themselves. One of the reduced versions of the painting hangs in Amalienborg Palace. A portrait study of Crown Princess Louise is on display in Sønderborg Castle. It was acquired by the Ny Carlsberg Foundation and presented to the museum in 1939.

Tuxen's painting has also served as an inspiration for Thomas Klugge's group portrait painting of The Family of Margrethe II of Denmark.

Further reading
 Svanholm, Line and Christian Fønss-Lundberg, Thyge: Tuxen. De kongelige billeder (2019)

References

External links

 Source
 Source
 Source
 Source

Paintings by Laurits Tuxen
Group portraits by Danish artists
Cultural depictions of Frederick VIII of Denmark
Cultural depictions of Christian IX of Denmark
Cultural depictions of Edward VII
1886 paintings